Karel Aeneas Jacobus de Croeser (Charles-Enée-Jacques de Croeser) (14 July 1746 - 22 January 1828) served as the Mayor of Bruges (Brugge) between 1803 and 1813, and then for a second ten-year term from 1817 to 1827.

Biography
He was the first man elected to the post after the contentious establishment of the United Kingdom of the Netherlands in 1815. By that time, he had already achieved a measure of notability more broadly as a poet and genealogist.

Provenance
Karel Aeneas de Croeser was born in Bruges at a time when almost the entire southern part of the Netherlands was flourishing economically as a semi-detached Austrian province. His father, Karel Jozef de Croeser (1701-1775), was an army officer. Both his father and his mother, born Marie Charlotte Stochove (1724-1774), came from prominent Flemish families.

Early years
His secondary schooling was with the Augustinians in Bruges, after which he moved on to study successfully for a degree in Law at the (not yet split) University of Leuven, on the far side of Brussels. By January 1792 he was back in Bruges. He embarked on a career in public administration, working as a municipal "Schepen" (sometimes translated as "magistrate") in the second to last city administration to be appointed before the entire region was over-run by French revolutionary "citizen armies". In 1794, as far as surviving sources disclose, he disappeared for three years. He resurfaced in 1797, still based in Bruges, as a member of the departmental council for the recently created department of Lys, in a by now greatly enlarged version of France. The departmental council quickly became indistinguishable, in terms of its membership and principal activities, from its Ancien Régime precursor. 1802 marked the start of his lengthy incumbency as chairman of the departmental council.

Mayor of Bruges
In addition, de Croeser was appointed Mayor of Bruges in 1803, remaining in the post without a break until 1813. He was succeeded by Jean-Jacques van Zuylen van Nyevelt who after 1815 combined his civic responsibilities with membership of the Dutch parliament ("Tweede Kamer der Staten-Generaal"). However, in 1817 van Nyevelt abruptly withdrew from both national and city politics, probably in order to spend more time with his young second wife and their expanding family. Karel Aeneas de Croeser then returned to office as the city's mayor, serving between 1817 and his resignation in 1827.

There was much that de Croeser did for the city. The arrival of French revolutionary invaders in 1794 marked the start of a new age of government-mandated secularism, and in 1800 he organised the removal of the great bell from the Church of Our Lady ("Onze-Lieve-Vrouwekerk") and had it rehung in the city's belfry. In its new position the bell was first rung in order to celebrate the Treaty of Amiens, celebrated by politicians and historians on both sides as an important (if rather short-lived) triumph.  As regards the bell tower, this would not be the last time that de Croeser provided for additions and enhancements to the bells that regulated business and life in the city. On the front of the belfry he had a large replacement statue of the Virgin Mary placed in the empty niche above the entrance, to replace the one that had been destroyed in the revolution a few years earlier. He had the Boeveriepoort (city gate) rebuilt in 1811.   He also, in 1819, reinvigorated the "Noble Fraternity of the Holy Blood" after two decades during which it had been repressed and subsequently become terminally dormant.

One out-of town project to which he devoted his energies was the development of the city's "Central Cemetery", a short distance outside the walls, along the route towards Oostkamp. The first burial there had taken place in 1787. But citizens had been reluctant to bury their deceased relatives outside the confines of the city; and it was only in 1804, under Mayor de Croeser, that burials within the city walls were ended. Prominent families were encouraged to set the right example, and he had a special mausoleum constructed at the cemetery for the bodies of leading citizens. His own was one of the first bodies to end up in it.

De Croeser and Napoleon 

On 11 July 1803 de Croeser welcomed First Consul Napoleon to Bruges. He was clearly not a great supporter of the new ruler, and was later reprimanded by the prefect for having had the flag on the belfry lowered before Bonaparte had even left the city. The visit was subsequently celebrated with a painting by the establishment portraitist Joseph Denis Odevaere showing de Croeser and Napoleon. Completed in 1807, the painting still (in 2020) hangs in the city hall. When the artist embarked on his commission there was already available a portrait of de Croeser, possibly originally created as a preliminary study for another work. For his portrait of the two men together Odevaere carefully cut out the existing available portrait and had it carefully sewn in an appropriate position on his new canvas, with the result that keen eyed viewers may gain the initial impression that the portrait of the men together has at some stage been badly damaged and thereafter repaired. By the time of Napoleon's next visit to Bruges, an arguably more impressive portrait of Karel Aeneas de Croeser had been produced, by van der Donckt, which in 2020 was reportedly hanging in the city hall near the earlier.

In 1804 Napoleon crowned himself emperor, and by the time of his second visit to Bruges, in 1810, had divorced his first wife. He arrived, instead, with his new wife, Marie Louise I. The second visit was very much more cordial than the first, and Karel Aeneas de Croeser found himself awarded the prestigious Legion of Honour. The double portrait of the two men in the city hall was hastily amended to show the relevant insignia attached to the mayor's coat, which had also at some point found their way onto the Van der Donckt portrait.

Homes 
De Croeser owned a substantial house in the Gouden-Handstraat (literally "Golden Hand street"). But for much of each year he lived out of town at Ten Berge, a large castellated manor house a short distance outside the city, to the north. He owned an extensive library and family archive which included much written material from the sixteenth century historian Nicolaas Despars, some of which was later re-published during the nineteenth century. The archive also included the De Hooghe manuscript and the important Gruuthuse manuscript.  There was, in addition, a large collection of ancestral portraits.

Family 
Karel-Aeneas de Croeser married Anna de Carnin de Staden (1747-1803) in 1777. The marriage was followed by the births of the couple's four sons. Two of the four married and became patriarchs in their own right, but the family line is believed to have died out with the death of Alexandre de Croeser (1839 - 1903). He had married Euphémie de Ruysscher (1835-1911), but their only child was born dead.

Publications (selection)
Besides being a Latin-language poet, de Creuser produced a number of extensive works on genealogy, which he published independently:

Notes

References

Mayors of Bruges
Belgian nobility
Dutch nobility
19th-century Belgian politicians
1746 births
1828 deaths
People from Bruges